Chewing gum is a type of confection traditionally made of chicle or synthetic rubber.

Chewing gum may also refer to:

Books, film and TV
 Chewing Gum (TV series), a British comedy series
 Chewing Gum (novel), a 2014 novel by Mansour Bushnaf
 Chewingum, a 1984 teen comedy film

Music
Chewing Gum (folk duo) (ja) winners of Yamaha Popular Song Contest Grand Prix 1972
 Chewing Gum (EP), a 1997 EP from Polar Bear
 "Chewing Gum" (song), a 2004 song by Annie
 "Chewing Gum", a 2015 song by Nina Nesbitt
 "Chewing Gum", a 2016 song by Poppy
 "Chewing Gum", a Korean song by NCT Dream

See also
 Gum (disambiguation)
 Bubble gum
 Gums